St Helen's Church, Darley Dale is a Grade II* listed parish church in the Church of England in Darley Dale, Derbyshire.

History

The church has elements of architecture from the Norman to the Perpendicular Gothic periods. It was restored and enlarged between 1854 and 1855 at a cost of £1,300 by Henry Isaac Stevens and was reopened on 24 April 1855.

The church was restored again in 1908 by the architect Percy Heylyn Currey.

Parish status

The church is in a joint parish with:
Mission Room, Over Hackney
St Mary the Virgin's Church, South Darley
St John the Baptist's Church, Winster

Monuments
Sir Joseph Whitworth (churchyard)

Organ

The church contains a pipe organ by Brindley and Foster. A specification of the organ can be found on the National Pipe Organ Register.

See also
Grade II* listed buildings in Derbyshire Dales
Listed buildings in Darley Dale

References

Church of England church buildings in Derbyshire
Grade II* listed churches in Derbyshire